Bob Schmidt may refer to:

Bob Schmidt (American football) (born 1936), former American football offensive tackle
Bob Schmidt (Australian footballer) (born 1943), Australian rules footballer, member of the South Adelaide Football Club's official "Greatest Team"
Bob Schmidt (baseball) (1933–2015), former baseball catcher
Bob Schmidt (musician) (born 1968), American multi-instrumentalist and songwriter with Flogging Molly

See also
Robert Schmidt (disambiguation)